Paton is a city in Greene County, Iowa, United States. The population was 221 at the time of the 2020 census.

History
Paton got its start following construction of the railroad through the area.

Geography
Paton is located at  (42.163887, -94.254971).

Demographics

2010 census
At the 2010 census there were 236 people in 108 households, including 59 families, in the city. The racial makup of the city was 96.2% White, 1.7% African American, and 2.1% Native American. Hispanic or Latino of any race were 3.0%.

Of the 108 households 28.7% had children under the age of 18 living with them, 41.7% were married couples living together, 8.3% had a female householder with no husband present, 4.6% had a male householder with no wife present, and 45.4% were non-families. 42.6% of households were one person and 16.7% were one person aged 65 or older. The average household size was 2.19 and the average family size was 3.03.

The median age was 34.8 years. 25.8% of residents were under the age of 18; 7.7% were between the ages of 18 and 24; 25% were from 25 to 44; 27.2% were from 45 to 64; and 14.4% were 65 or older. The gender makeup of the city was 48.3% male and 51.7% female.

2000 census
At the 2000 census there were 265 people in 118 households, including 71 families, in the city. The population density was 468.3 persons per square mile (179.5/km). The racial makup of the city was 98.49% White, 0.38% Asian, 1.13% from other races. Hispanic or Latino of any race were 1.51%.

Of the 118 households 27.1% had children under the age of 18 living with them, 53.4% were married couples living together, 6.8% had a female householder with no husband present, and 39.0% were non-families. 37.3% of households were one person and 24.6% were one person aged 65 or older. The average household size was 2.25 and the average family size was 2.96.

In the city, the age distribution of the population shows 26.4% under the age of 18, 6.0% from 18 to 24, 24.5% from 25 to 44, 18.1% from 45 to 64, and 24.9% 65 or older. The median age was 41 years. For every 100 females, there were 93.4 males. For every 100 females age 18 and over, there were 89.3 males.

The median household income was $32,500 and the median family income  was $46,250. Males had a median income of $27,083 versus $24,821 for females. The per capita income for the city was $15,256. About 4.5% of families and 7.8% of the population were below the poverty line, including 3.6% of those under the age of eighteen and 3.6% of those sixty five or over.

Education 
Paton-Churdan Community School District operates area public schools.

Media

Popular culture 
Pvt. James Francis Ryan (Matt Damon) of the 101st Airborne, title character of the movie Saving Private Ryan, tells Capt. Miller (Tom Hanks) that he is from Paton, Iowa.

Loren Shriver is a 1962 graduate of Paton High School and was a Space Shuttle astronaut.  Shriver commanded the shuttle mission that deployed the Hubble Space Telescope into space.

References

Cities in Greene County, Iowa
Cities in Iowa